Otranto Plantation is a historic plantation house located in Hanahan, Berkeley County, South Carolina. It was built before 1778, and is a 1 1/2-half story, rectangular gable-roofed stuccoed brick dwelling.  It has an attached colonnaded piazza, or porch, on three sides. Also on the property is a contributing small frame servants’ house.

In 1934, the house was destroyed by a fire.  The house was meticulously restored based upon photographs before the fire.

It was listed in the National Register of Historic Places in 1978.

References

Houses on the National Register of Historic Places in South Carolina
Houses completed in 1778
Houses in Berkeley County, South Carolina
National Register of Historic Places in Berkeley County, South Carolina
Plantation houses in South Carolina